Ka'b, Kaab or Kab ( ka‘b) is an Arabic male given name. People named Ka'b include:
Ka'ab al-Ahbar
Ka'b ibn al-Ashraf
Ka'b ibn Asad
Ka'b ibn Lu'ayy
Ka'b Ibn Mama
Ka‘b bin Zaid bin An-Najjar
Ka'b bin Zuhayr

People using it in their patronymic include:
Murrah ibn Ka'b
Musa ibn Ka'b al-Tamimi
Nusaybah bint Ka'ab
Rābi'a bint Ka'b al-Quzdārī
Ubay ibn Ka'b

Arabic masculine given names